Dr. Pál Csokán (November 21, 1914 in Hódmezővásárhely – March 3, 1995 in Budapest) was a Hungarian chemistry professor, a well known researcher of corrosion science and protection.

After receiving his degree from University of Szeged in 1938, he was employed there for a few years as an assistant professor. From 1943 he worked at Danuvia engine plant and armory as a lab manager in Budapest. Later he became the head of division at the Institute of Metal Research and then at the General Engineering Institute. He earned his Ph.D. in 1957 and his Doctor of Sciences degree in 1963, on the topic of anodic oxidation of aluminium. During his research work he disproved the Keller-Hunter-Robinson theory of anodic film formation on the surface of aluminium. He has shown that the oxide layer is formed in nucleation seeds and not in an even manner. He wrote more than 200 scientific papers and 17 books. He was professor at University of Pannonia. He lectured for the postgraduate corrosion engineers in Veszprém and also on courses of Budapest University of Technology and Economics. He had many patents including the Autocolor-HSH for the coloured anodic oxidation of aluminium.

References 

Hungarian chemists
1914 births
1995 deaths
Academic staff of the University of Pannonia
University of Szeged alumni
Academic staff of the Budapest University of Technology and Economics
People from Hódmezővásárhely